Barberini may refer to:

 Apollo Barberini, a 1st–2nd-century Roman sculpture
 Barberini family, a family of the Italian nobility
 Barberini Faun, a marble statue in Germany
 Barberini – Fontana di Trevi, an underground station of the Rome Metro
 Museum Barberini, a museum in Germany
 Palazzo Barberini, a 17th-century palace in Rome
 Piazza Barberini, a square of Rome, Italy